Simon Jocher (born 25 May 1996) is a German World Cup alpine ski racer, and specializes in the speed events of downhill and super-G.

From Bavaria, Jocher has competed for Germany at one Winter Olympics and two World Championships.

World Cup results

Season standings

Top ten finishes
0 podiums, 2 top tens – (2 DH)

World Championship results

Olympic results

References

External links

1996 births
Living people
German male alpine skiers
Alpine skiers at the 2022 Winter Olympics
Olympic alpine skiers of Germany
21st-century German people